Nagla Gangi is a village situated 16 km from Sikandra Rao, and 30 km from Hathras District in Uttar Pradesh. Aligarh, Etah and Kasganj.

References
http://wikimapia.org/14011558/Village-Nagla-Gangi

Villages in Hathras district